Troy Newman may refer to:

 Troy Newman (activist), American anti-abortion activist
 Troy Newman (singer), Australian singer-songwriter and musician